Ab Chendar (also Romanized as  Āb Chendār; also known as Ābchenār) is a village in Olya Tayeb Rural District, in the Central District of Landeh County, Kohgiluyeh and Boyer-Ahmad Province, Iran. At the 2006 census, its population was 31, in 7 families.

References 

Populated places in Landeh County